Curt Liebich (17 November 1868, Wesel - 12 December 1937, Gutach) was a German painter, graphic artist and sculptor.

Life and work
After some initial training in Dresden, he transferred to the Berlin University of the Arts. After 1890, he studied at the Grand-Ducal Saxon Art School, Weimar. There, he met the famous "Black Forest Painter", Wilhelm Hasemann.

In 1896, he married Hasemann's sister-in-law, Antonie Lichtenberg, and settled in Gutach; painting scenes of rural and village life. He also created postcard motifs that made the bollenhut (a formal headdress) and the Black Forest house familiar throughout the world. As an illustrator, he designed title pages for books and magazines as well as advertising graphics. Together with Hasemann, he established the Gutach artists' colony.

During and after World War I, he helped create several war memorials; in Dunningen, Laufenburg, Meissenheim, Rhina and Schapbach. In 1917, he was named a professor by Frederick II, Grand Duke of Baden.

Antonie died in 1919. The following year, he married her younger sister, Emma. In 1923, he was named an honorary citizen of Gutach. In 1933, he designed the Gutacher honorary citizenship certificates for Robert Heinrich Wagner and Adolf Hitler.

The Kunstmuseum Hasemann-Liebich, featuring works by both artists, was opened in Gutach in 2005.

References

Further reading 
 Ansgar Barth: Curt Liebich, ein Künstler in seiner Zeit, Gutach (Schwarzwaldbahn) 2018 
 Werner Liebich: Schwarzwaldmaler Curt Liebich 1868–1937, Haslach 1987
 Joachim Baumann, Peter Schäfer: Curt Liebich, Künstlerpostkarten, Schonach/Trossingen 2008

External links 

 Kunstmuseum Hasemann-Liebich, website

1868 births
1937 deaths
19th-century German painters
19th-century German male artists
German graphic designers
German illustrators
Postcard artists
Berlin University of the Arts alumni
People from Wesel
20th-century German painters
20th-century German male artists